Clifford Lynch is the director of the Coalition for Networked Information (CNI), where he has been since 1997. He is also an adjunct professor at Berkeley's School of Information.

Career and awards
Prior to joining CNI, Lynch spent eighteen years at the University of California Office of the President, the last ten as Director of Library Automation. He is both a past president and recipient of the 2008 Award of Merit of the American Society for Information Science and Technology (ASIS&T), and a fellow of the American Association for the Advancement of Science and the National Information Standards Organization. Lynch lectures extensively on issues pertaining to digital libraries, information policy, and emerging interoperability standards.

In 2011 he was appointed co-chair of the National Academies Board on Research Data and Information (BRDI); His work has been recognized by the American Library Association's Lippincott Award, the EDUCAUSE Leadership Award in Public Policy and Practice, and the American Society for Engineering Education's Homer Bernhardt Award. He was elected as an ACM Fellow in 2017.

Education
Lynch holds a B.A in Mathematics and Computer Science from Columbia College, a M.S. in Computer Science from the Columbia University School of Engineering, and a Ph.D. in Computer Science (1987) from the University of California, Berkeley.

Selected publications

Clifford Lynch, Stewardship in the "Age of Algorithms", First Monday, Volume 22, Number 12 (4 December 2017). 
Clifford A. Lynch, "Big data: How do your data grow?" Nature, vol. 455, no. 7209 (September 3, 2008). 
Clifford A. Lynch, "Digital Libraries, Learning Communities, and Open Education," Opening Up Education: The Collective Advancement of Education through Open Technology, Open Content, and Open Knowledge, Toru Iiyoshi, M. S. Vijay Kumar (Eds.), (Cambridge, MA: MIT Press, 2008).
Clifford A. Lynch, "Imagining a University Press System to Support Scholarship in the Digital Age." Journal of Electronic Publishing. November 2012.
Clifford A. Lynch and Joan K. Lippincott, "Institutional Repository Deployment in the United States as of Early 2005," D-Lib Magazine, 11:9 (September 2005).
Clifford A. Lynch, "The Impact of Digital Scholarship on Research Libraries," The Journal of Library Administration 49:3 (April 2009), pp. 227–244.
Clifford A. Lynch, "Open Computation: Beyond Human-Reader-Centric Views of Scholarly Literatures," Open Access: Key Strategic, Technical and Economic Aspects, Neil Jacobs (Ed.), (Oxford: Chandos Publishing, 2006), 185–193.
Clifford A. Lynch, "Searching the Internet," Scientific American 276:3 (March 1997), pp. 52–56.

References

Year of birth missing (living people)
Living people
University of California, Berkeley School of Information faculty
University of California, Berkeley alumni
Scholarly communication
Fellows of the Association for Computing Machinery
Columbia College (New York) alumni
Columbia School of Engineering and Applied Science alumni